Lake Bracken is a reservoir in Galesburg, Knox County, Illinois, United States. Managed by the Lake Bracken Country Club, the lake was formed in 1921 with the damming of Brush Creek. Its "overall resource quality" was assessed as "fair" in 1996 by the Illinois Environmental Protection Agency. Channel catfish, largemouth bass, and carp are known to live in the lake.

Lake Bracken was originally formed by the CB&Q (now Burlington Northern) in order to supply its major "Shops" and "Yards" in Galesburg, Illinois with water for the steam locomotives and other machines, equipment, and systems requiring large amounts of water.

References

External links 
 Lake Bracken Country Club

Reservoirs in Illinois
Protected areas of Knox County, Illinois
Bodies of water of Knox County, Illinois
1921 establishments in Illinois